The Second Coming (sometimes called the Second Advent or the Parousia) is a Christian, Islamic as well as Baha'i belief that Jesus will return again after his ascension to heaven about two thousand years ago. The idea is based on messianic prophecies and is part of most Christian eschatologies.

Terminology

Several different terms are used to refer to the Second Coming of Christ:

In the New Testament, the Greek word ἐπιφάνεια (epiphaneia, appearing) is used five times to refer to the return of Christ.

The Greek New Testament uses the Greek term parousia (παρουσία, meaning "arrival", "coming", or "presence") twenty-four times, seventeen of them concerning Christ. However, parousia has the distinct reference to a period of time rather than an instance in time. At  parousia is used to clearly describe the period of time that Noah lived. The Greek word eleusis which means "coming" is not interchangeable with parousia. So this parousia or "presence" would be unique and distinct from anything that had occurred before. The word is also used six times referring to individuals (Stephanas, Fortunatus and Achaicus, Titus, and Paul the Apostle ) and one time referring to the "coming of the lawless one".

Gustav Adolf Deissmann (1908) showed that the Greek word parousia occurred as early as the 3rd century BC to describe the visit of a king or dignitary to a city – a visit arranged in order to show the visitor's magnificence to the people.

In Islam, the term Rajʽa refers to the Second Coming. The term is most commonly used by Shia Muslims.

Specific date predictions and claims

Views about the nature of the Second Coming vary among Christian denominations and among individual Christians. Many specific dates have been predicted for the Second Coming, some now in the distant past, others still in the future.

Christianity

Most English versions of the Nicene Creed include the following statements:

A 2010 survey showed that about 40% of Americans believe that Jesus is likely to return by 2050. This varies from 58% of white evangelical Christians, through 32% of Catholics to 27% of white mainline Protestants. Belief in the Second Coming was popularised in the US in the late nineteenth century by the evangelist Dwight L. Moody and the premillennial interpretation became one of the core components of Christian fundamentalism in the 1920s.

Early Christianity

Jesus told his disciples,

The most common English translation of genea is "generation", which lead some to conclude that the Second Coming was to be witnessed by the people living in the same generation as Jesus. For instance, according to historian Charles Freeman, early Christians expected Jesus to return within a generation of his death and the non-occurrence of the second coming really surprised the early Christian communities.

In most German Bibles, genea is instead translated as "family/lineage" (geschlecht). Likewise for Danish, Swedish and Norwegian (slægt, släkte and slekt, respectively). The Danish linguist Iver Larsen argues that the word "generation" as it was used in the King James Version of the Bible (1611) had a much wider meaning than it has today, and that the correct translation of genea in the context of the second coming is "kind of people" (specifically the "good" kind of people; the disciple's kind of people, who, like the words of Jesus, will endure through all the tribulations). In Psalm 14, the King James version uses "generation" in this wide and outdated sense, when it declares that "God is in the generation of the righteous." According to Larsen, the Oxford Universal Dictionary states that the latest attested use of genea in the sense of "class, kind or set of persons" dates from 1727. Larsen concludes that the meaning of "generation" in the English language has narrowed considerably since then.

Bible scholar Philip La Grange du Toit argues that genea is mostly used to describe a timeless and spiritual family/lineage of good or bad people in the New Testament, and that this is the case also for the second coming discourse in Matthew 24. In contrast to Larsen however, he argues that the word genea here denotes the "bad kind of people", because Jesus had used the word in that pejorative sense in the preceding context (chapter 23.) He also lists the main competing translation alternatives, and some of the scholars who support the different views:

 "This generation" refers to Jesus' contemporaries who would witness "all these things" [πάντα ταῦτα] as outlined in verses 4–31, including Jesus' second coming (Davies & Allison 1997:367–368; Hare 1993:281; Maddox 1982:111–115). Because Jesus' contemporaries did not witness his second coming, some contend that Jesus erred in his predictions (Luz 2005:209; cf. Schweitzer 1910:356–364). 
 "This generation" refers to Jesus' contemporaries who would witness "all these things" as outlined in verses 4–22 or 4–28, pointing to the destruction of the temple in 70 CE and everything leading up to it. Jesus' second coming (vv. 29–31) is thus excluded from "all these things" (Blomberg 1992:364; Carson 1984:507; France 2007:930; Hagner 1995:715).
 "This generation" points to the Ἰουδαῖοι [Jews or Judaeans], implying that they as a race would last until the Parousia (Hendriksen 1973:868–869; Schweizer 1976:458).
 In patristic opinion, "this generation" points to the church against which the gates of Hades would not prevail (cf. Chrysostom, Hom. Matt. 77:1; Eusebius, Frag. in Lc. ad loc).
 ‘This generation’ points to some future generation, from Matthew's perspective, that sees "all these things" (Bock 1996:538–539; Conzelmann 1982:105).
 The words "take place" or "have happened" [γένηται] are interpreted as an ingressive aorist: "to begin" or "to have a beginning". In other words, "all these things" would start to happen in the generation of Jesus' present disciples, but would not necessarily finish in their time (Cranfield 1954:291; Talbert 2010:270).
 "This generation" points to a certain kind of people in accordance with the pejorative connotations to "generation" [γενεά] elsewhere in the gospel (Morris 1992:613; Nelson 1996:385; Rieske 2008:225; see, e.g., Mt 11:16; 12:39, 41–42, 45; 16:4; 17:17; 23:36). While DeBruyn (2010:190) and Lenski (1943:953) interpret the expression in a similar way, they connect "this generation" to a certain kind of people from the Ἰουδαῖοι who resisted Jesus (cf. view 3 discussed earlier).

Jesus is also recorded as saying,

A competing view is that it is Jesus' coming in power on the mountain that provides the correct interpretative frame for the "not taste death" statement. The author of Second Peter describes the event:

Preterism

The position associating the Second Coming with 1st century events such as the destruction of Jerusalem and of the Jewish Temple in AD 70 is known as Preterism.

Some Preterists see this "coming of the Son of Man in glory" primarily fulfilled in Jesus' death on the cross. They believe the apocalyptic signs are already fulfilled including "the sun will be dark" (cf. ), the "powers ... will be shaken," (cf. ) and "then they will see" (cf. ). Yet some critics note that many are missing, such as "But the day of the Lord will come as a thief in the night, in which the heavens will pass away with a great noise, and the elements will melt with fervent heat; both the earth and the works that are in it will be burned up.". And "Then the sign of the Son of Man will appear in heaven, and then all the tribes of the earth will mourn, and they will see the Son of Man coming on the clouds of heaven with power and great glory."

Catholicism

According to the Catholic Church, the second coming will happen in a single moment, suddenly and unexpectedly (not even the angels, saints, or demons know when it will occur). It will cause the fullness of the reign of God and the consummation of the universe and mankind.

The fullness of the reign of God means God fully manifests the victory he won over his enemies (sin, suffering, and Satan) on the Cross. Just as God gradually revealed himself to Israel until the birth of Jesus, so God gradually manifests his victory through the church's sacraments (baptism forgiving sin and exorcising Satan, holy unction relieving suffering, etc.), until the moment when he will fully manifest his victory through the consummation of the universe and mankind, e.g., by granting the universe and mankind a share in Jesus' resurrection (the universe being transfigured and the dead being resurrected, judged, and recompensed).

The church does not believe the second coming will happen via a catastrophe (such as a nuclear war or extinction event), reincarnation (such as someone claiming to be Jesus), social or technological progress (such as mankind abolishing slavery or curing disease) or ascendancy (such as the church having political power). Nor does the church believe in double predestination.

At the moment of Jesus' arrival, three events will happen all at once in an instant, in the blink of an eye: the living will die, the universe will be transfigured, and the dead will be resurrected, judged, and recompensed. After this single instant or moment, the church does not know what will happen for the rest of eternity - only that the damned will continue to be in hell and the saved will continue to experience the beatific vision.

The second coming is suspended until Jesus is recognized by "all of Israel," and it will be followed by a final and ultimate temptation to sin - in this case, apostasy - caused by the antichrist. Yet there are three things that hasten the second coming: the celebration of the Eucharist; Christians living with the mind of Jesus; and Christians praying for the Second Coming.

Like many Christian denominations, the church considers this second coming of Christ to be the final and eternal judgment by God of the people in every nation resulting in the glorification of some and the punishment of others. The concept is found in all the Canonical gospels, particularly the Gospel of Matthew.

A decisive factor in this Last Judgment during the second coming of Christ will be the question, if the corporal and spiritual works of mercy were practiced or not during lifetime. They rate as important acts of mercy, charity and justice. Therefore, and according to the Biblical sources (Matthew 25:31–46), the conjunction of the Last Judgment and the works of mercy is very frequent in the pictorial tradition of Christian art.

Oriental Orthodoxy and Eastern Orthodoxy
It is the traditional view of Orthodox Christians, preserved from the early Church, that the Second Coming will be a sudden and unmistakable incident, like "a flash of lightning". They hold the general view that Jesus will not spend any time on the earth in ministry or preaching, but come to judge mankind. They teach that the ministry of the Antichrist will take place right before the Second Coming.

The Ethiopian Orthodox Church, a part of the Oriental Orthodox communion of churches, teaches that the second coming of Jesus will be radically different than his first coming, which "was to save the lost world".

Orthodox layman Alexander Kalomiros explains the original Church's position regarding the Second Coming in River of Fire and Against False Union, stating that those who contend that Christ will reign on earth for a thousand years "do not wait for Christ, but for the Antichrist." The idea of Jesus returning to this earth as a king is a heretical concept to the Church, equated to "the expectations of the Jews who wanted the Messiah to be an earthly King." The Church instead teaches that which it has taught since the beginning.

Lutheranism and Anglicanism

A reference to the second coming is contained in the Nicene Creed and Apostles Creed, which is recited during the Lutheran and Anglican liturgies: "He [Jesus] shall come again in glory to judge the living and the dead; and His kingdom shall have no end." An analogous statement is also in the biblical Pauline Creed.

The Lutheran and Anglican churches proclaim the Mystery of Faith in their liturgies: "Christ has died, Christ is risen, Christ will come again."

Methodism
Methodist denominations teach that the Second Coming is connected with the Last Judgment, as professed in the Creeds. The United Methodist Church does not teach that there will be a "rapture" but doesn't otherwise speculate on the nature of the Second Coming.

Latter Day Saint movement

The standard works of the largest denomination in the Latter Day Saint movement, The Church of Jesus Christ of Latter-day Saints (LDS Church), say that Christ will return, as stated in the Bible. They also teach that  The LDS Church and its leaders do not make predictions of the actual date of the Second Coming.

Latter-day Saints have particularly distinct and specific interpretations of what are considered to be signs stated in the Book of Revelation.
According to LDS Church teachings, the restored gospel will be taught in all parts of the world prior to the Second Coming. Church members believe that there will be increasingly severe wars, earthquakes, hurricanes, and other man-made and natural disasters prior to the Second Coming.

Seventh-day Adventists

Fundamental Belief #25 of the Seventh-day Adventist Church states:

Jehovah's Witnesses
Jehovah's Witnesses rarely use the term "second coming", preferring the term "presence" as a translation of parousia. They also believe that biblical chronology points to 1914 as the start of Christ's "presence", which continues until the final battle of Armageddon. Other biblical expressions they correlate with this period include "the time of the end", "the conclusion of the system of things" and "the last days". Witnesses believe Christ's millennial reign begins after Armageddon.

Emanuel Swedenborg and the New Church
Emanuel Swedenborg, an 18th century scientist turned theologian, taught that his time (that historians have called the Age of Enlightenment) was an age of darkness and doubt for the Christian church. Historian Marguerite Beck Block writes,

Esoteric Christian teachings

In Max Heindel's teaching, there is a distinction between the cosmic Christ, or Christ without, and the Christ within. According to this tradition, the Christ within is regarded as the true Saviour who needs to be born within each individual in order to evolve toward the future Sixth Epoch in the Earth's etheric plane, that is, toward the "new heavens and a new earth": the New Galilee. The Second Coming or Advent of the Christ is not in a physical body, but in the new soul body of each individual in the etheric plane of the planet where man "shall be caught up in the clouds to meet the Lord in the air." The "day and hour" of this event is not known. The esoteric Christian tradition teaches that first there will be a preparatory period as the Sun enters Aquarius, an astrological concept, by precession: the coming Age of Aquarius.

Islam

Traditional view

In Islam, Jesus (or Isa) is considered to be a Messenger of God and the masih (messiah) who was sent to guide banī isrā'īl (the Israelites) with a new scripture, the Injīl (Gospel). The belief in Jesus (and all other messengers of God) is required in Islam, and a requirement of being a Muslim. However, Muslims do not recognize Jesus as the Son of God, as they believe God has no equals, but instead as a prophet. The Quran states that Jesus was born of the Virgin Mary. Muslims believe that Jesus performed all the miracles in the Gospels (with God's permission), but do not believe that Jesus was crucified. The pertinent verses in Sura An-Nisa 4:157 reads “And for their saying, ‘Indeed, we have killed the Messiah, Jesus, the son of Mary, the messenger of Allah.’ And they did not kill him, nor did they crucify him; but another was made to resemble him to them. And indeed, those who differ over it are in doubt about it. They have no knowledge of it except the following of assumption. And they did not kill him, for certain.” 4:158 continues “rather, Allah raised him to Himself. And ever is Allah Exalted in Might and Wise.”

The Quran refers to a conversation between Jesus and God on judgement day in Sura Al-Ma'idah 5:116, 5:117. Jesus is questioned 5:116 "Did you ever ask the people to worship you and your mother as gods besides Allah?". To which Jesus replies 5:117 "I never told them anything except what You ordered me to say: “Worship Allah—my Lord and your Lord!” And I was witness over them as long as I remained among them."

In the Quran, the second coming of Jesus is heralded in Sura Az-Zukhruf as a sign of the Day of Judgment.

Ibn Kathir presents this verse as proof of Jesus' second coming in the Quran in his exegesis Tafsir al-Qur'an al-Azim.

There are also hadiths that foretell Jesus' future return such as: Sahih al-Bukhari, Volume 3, Book 43: Kitab-ul-`Ilm (Book of Knowledge), Hadith Number 656:

According to Islamic tradition, Jesus' descent will be in the midst of wars fought by the Mahdi (lit. "the rightly guided one"), known in Islamic eschatology as the redeemer of Islam, against the al-Masih ad-Dajjal (literally "the false messiah", synonymous with the Antichrist) and his followers. Jesus will descend at the point of a white arcade, east of Damascus, dressed in saffron robes — his head anointed. He will then join the Mahdi in his war against the Dajjal. Jesus, considered in Islam as a Muslim (one who submits to God) and one of God's messengers, will abide by the Islamic teachings. Eventually, Jesus will slay the Antichrist Dajjal, and then everyone from the People of the Book (ahl al-kitāb, referring to Jews and Christians) will believe in him. Thus, there will be one community, that of Islam. 

After the death of the Mahdi, Jesus will assume leadership. This is a time associated in Islamic narrative with universal peace and justice. Islamic texts also allude to the appearance of Ya'juj and Ma'juj (Gog and Magog), ancient tribes that will disperse and cause disturbance on earth. God, in response to Jesus' prayers, will kill them by sending a type of worm in the napes of their necks. Jesus' rule is said to be around forty years, after which he will die, (according to Islam Jesus did not die on the cross but was taken up to heaven and continues to live until his return in the second coming). Muslims will then perform the Salat al-Janazah (funeral prayer) for him and bury him in the city of Medina in a grave left vacant beside Muhammad.

Ahmadiyya

The Ahmadiyya movement believe that the promised Mahdi and Messiah arrived in the person of Mirza Ghulam Ahmad (1835–1908). This is widely rejected by other Muslims, who do not regard Ahmadis as a legitimate sect of Islam.

The hadith (sayings of the Islamic prophet Muhammad) and the Bible indicated that Jesus would return during the latter days. Islamic tradition commonly depicts that Jesus, upon his second coming, would be an Ummati (Muslim) and a follower of Muhammad and that he would revive the truth of Islam rather than fostering a new religion.

The Ahmadiyya movement interpret the Second Coming of Jesus prophesied as being that of a person "similar to Jesus" (mathīl-i ʿIsā) and not his physical return, in the same way as John the Baptist resembled the character of the biblical prophet Elijah in Christianity. Ahmadis believe that Mirza Ghulam Ahmad (the founder of the movement) demonstrated that the prophecy in Muslim and Christian religious texts were traditionally misunderstood to suggest that Jesus of Nazareth himself would return, and hold that Jesus survived the crucifixion and later died a natural death. Ahmadis consider Ghulam Ahmad, in both his character and teachings, to be representative of Jesus, and that he attained the same spiritual rank of Prophethood as Jesus. Thus, Ahmadis believe this prediction was fulfilled and continued by his movement.

Baháʼí Faith

According to the Baháʼí Faith, the Second Coming is a gradual process that coincides with the advancement of human civilization from the beginning of humanity. It teaches that the founders of the major world religions each represent a return of the Word and Spirit of God as a new, unique personification sent by God, who introduces new teachings, laws and revelations, such that all major religions are part of a progressive revelation. Each Coming is said to build upon the major world religions emerging from earlier ages, verifying previous spiritual truths, and fulfilling its prophesies regarding a future return or coming. In this context, the Second Coming is depicted as a continuation of God's will in one continuous faith, with different names as presented by the founders of each religion as the voice of God at different times in history.

Bahá'u'lláh announced that he was a manifestation of the returned Christ, understood as a reappearance of the Word and Spirit of God: He wrote to Pope Pius IX,  He referred to himself as the Ancient of Days and the Pen of Glory, and also claimed: Baha'u'llah also wrote, 

Followers of the Baháʼí Faith believe that prophecies of the second coming of Jesus (along with prophecies from other religions) were fulfilled by his forerunner the Báb in 1844 and then by the events occurring during the days of Bahá'u'lláh. They believe that the fulfillment of Christian prophecies by Baha'u'llah is similar to Jesus' fulfillment of Jewish prophecies, where in both cases people were expecting the literal fulfillment of apocalyptic statements that led to rejections of the Return, instead of accepting fulfillment in symbolic and spiritual ways. Baháʼís understand that the return of the Christ with a new name was intended by Jesus to be a Return in a spiritual sense, due to Jesus explaining in the Gospels that the return of Elijah in John the Baptist was a return in a spiritual sense.

Judaism

Judaism teaches that Jesus is one of the false Jewish Messiah claimants because he failed to fulfill any Messianic prophecies, which include:
 Build the Third Temple.
 Gather all Jews back to the Land of Israel.
 Usher in an era of world peace, and end all hatred, oppression, suffering and disease. As it says: "Nation shall not lift up sword against nation, neither shall man learn war anymore."
 Spread universal knowledge of the God of Israel, which will unite humanity as one. As it says: "God will be King over all the world ― on that day, God will be One and His Name will be One". Regarding the Christian idea that these prophecies will be fulfilled during a "second coming," Ohr Samayach states "we find this to be a contrived answer, since there is no mention of a second coming in the Jewish Bible. Second, why couldn't God accomplish His goals the first time round?" Rabbi David Wolpe believes that the Second Coming was "grown out of genuine disappointment. [...] When Jesus died, true believers had to theologically compensate for the disaster."

Rastafari
In the early developments of the Rastafari religion, Haile Selassie (the Ethiopian Emperor) was regarded as a member of the House of David, is worshipped as God incarnate, and is thought to be the "black Jesus" and "black messiah" – the second coming of Christ. It was claimed that Marcus Garvey preached the coming of the black messiah on the eve of Selassie's coronation. Due to this prophecy, Selassie was the source of inspiration of the poor and uneducated Christian populations of Jamaica, who believed that the Emperor would liberate the black people from the subjugation of European colonists.

Paramahansa Yogananda's commentary
In modern times some traditional Indian religious leaders have moved to embrace Jesus as an avatar, or incarnation, of God. In light of this, the Indian guru Paramahansa Yogananda, author of Autobiography of a Yogi, wrote an extensive commentary on the Gospels published in 2004 in the two-volume set The Second Coming of Christ: The Resurrection of the Christ Within You. The book offers a mystical interpretation of the Second Coming in which it is understood to be an inner experience, something that takes place within the individual heart. In the introduction of this book, Yogananda wrote that the true Second Coming is the resurrection within you of the Infinite Christ Consciousness. Also stated in the Book of Luke – "Neither shall they say, Lo here! or, lo there! for, behold, the kingdom of God is within you."

Daya Mata wrote in the preface of The Second Coming of Christ that the "two-volume scriptural treatise thus represents the inclusive culmination of Paramahansa Yogananda's divine commission to make manifest to the world the essence of original Christianity as taught by Jesus Christ."  In sharing her memories of when she wrote down his words, she shares – "the great Guru, his face radiantly enraptured, as he records for the world the inspired exposition of the Gospel teachings imparted to him through direct, personal communion with Jesus of Nazareth." Larry Dossey, M.D., wrote that "Paramahansa Yogananda's The Second Coming of Christ is one of the most important analyses of Jesus’ teachings that exists....Many interpretations of Jesus’ words divide peoples, cultures, and nations; these foster unity and healing, and that is why they are vital for today's world."

In modern culture
Jesus Christ returning to earth has been a theme in several movies and books, for example:
 The Seventh Sign – 1988 film starring Demi Moore about a pregnant lady who discovers the Second Coming of Christ has rented a room from her, in order to begin the countdown that will trigger the Apocalypse.
 Left Behind – Film- and book-franchise (1995– ) built by Tim LaHaye and Jerry B. Jenkins based on the time-period before, during and after the Second Coming of Christ.
 End of Days – 1999 action-adventure film starring Arnold Schwarzenegger about a policeman who must stop Satan before he ends the world.
 Thief In the Night by William Bernard Sears – The popular TV and radio personality plays the role of a detective in writing a book about identifying the clues and symbols from the Biblical prophecies of the return of the Christ that have been overlooked or misunderstood, and settles on a shocking conclusion (2002) [1961]. Oxford, UK: George Ronald. .
 SCARS: Christian Fiction End-Times Thriller by Patience Prence – 2010 novel about a girl named Becky who struggles through the time of the Great Tribulation.
At the End of All Things by Stony Graves – 2011 novel about the days following the Rapture, and right before the Final War between God and Satan.
 The Second Coming: A Love Story by Scott Pinsker – 2014 novel about two men who claim to be the Second Coming of Christ. Each claims that the other is a liar – but only one is telling the truth.
 Black Jesus – Adult Swim television series (2014-2015 and 2019) created by Aaron McGruder and Mike Clattenburg, tells the story of Jesus living in modern-day Compton, California, and his efforts to spread love and kindness on a daily basis. He is supported in his mission by a small-but-loyal group of downtrodden followers, while facing conflicts involving corrupt preachers, ethnic tensions, and the hate spreading activities of the manager of his apartment complex.

See also
 False prophet
 Inaugurated eschatology
 Kalki
 List of messiah claimants
 List of people claimed to be Jesus
 Life of Jesus in the New Testament
 Realized eschatology
 "The Second Coming" (poem), by William Butler Yeats

References

Bibliography
 C. S. Lewis. (1960). The World's Last Night and Other Essays. Harcourt Brace Jovanovich. 
 Max Heindel. How Shall We Know Christ at His Coming?, May 1913 (stenographic report of a lecture, Los Angeles), 
 Markus Mühling. Grundinformation Eschatologie. Systematische Theologie aus der Perspektive der Hoffnung, Vandenhoeck & Ruprecht, Göttingen 2007, 221–241
 James Stuart Russell. The Parousia, A Careful Look at the New Testament Doctrine of the Lord's Second Coming, London 1887
 Emanuel Swedenborg. The Consummation of the Age; the Coming of the Lord; and the New Heaven and New Church, Chapter 14 in The True Christian Religion Containing the Universal Theology of The New Church Foretold by the Lord in Daniel 7; 13, 14; and in Revelation 21; 1,2 (Swedenborg Foundation 1952)
 Henry Wansbrough. The New Jerusalem Bible (1990). Doubleday. 
 Paramahansa Yogananda. The Second Coming of Christ: The Resurrection of the Christ Within You. Self-Realization Fellowship, 2004.

External links

 "Lecture XV: On the Clause, And Shall Come in Glory to Judge the Quick and the Dead; Of Whose Kingdom There Shall Be No End.", delivered by Cyril of Jerusalem in the mid-4th century.
 "The Second Coming", a summary article.
 A Critical Summary of "The Second Coming" by W.B Yeats-RiseNotes

Biblical phrases
Christian eschatology
Christian terminology
Islamic terminology
Islamic eschatology